Dog anatomy comprises the anatomical studies of the visible parts of the body of a domestic dog. Details of structures vary tremendously from breed to breed, more than in any other animal species, wild or domesticated, as dogs are highly variable in height and weight. The smallest known adult dog was a Yorkshire Terrier that stood only  at the shoulder,  in length along the head and body, and weighed only . The tallest known adult dog is a Great Dane that stands  at the shoulder.

Anatomy

Source:

Muscles
The following is a list of the muscles in the dog, along with their origin, insertion, action and innervation.

Extrinsic muscles of the thoracic limb and related structures:

Descending superficial pectoral: originates on the first sternebrae and inserts on the greater tubercle of the humerus. It both adducts the limb and also prevents the limb from being abducted during weight bearing. It is innervated by the cranial pectoral nerves.

Transverse superficial pectoral: originates on the second and third sternebrae and inserts on the greater tubercle of the humerus. It also adducts the limb and prevents the limb from being abducted during weight bearing. It is innervated by the cranial pectoral nerves.

Deep pectoral: originates on the ventral sternum and inserts on the lesser tubercle of the humerus. It acts to extend the shoulder joint during weight bearing and flexes the shoulder when there is no weight. It is innervated by the caudal pectoral nerves.

Sternocephalicus: originates on the sternum and inserts on the temporal bone of the head. Its function is to move the head and neck from side to side. It is innervated by the accessory nerve.

Sternohyoideus: originates on the sternum and inserts on the basihyoid bone. Its function is to move the tongue caudally. It is innervated by the ventral branches of the cervical spinal nerves.

Sternothyoideus: originates on the first coastal cartilage and inserts on the thyroid cartilage. Its function is also to move the tongue caudally. It is innervated by the ventral branches of the cervical spinal nerves.

Omotransversarius: originates on the spine of the scapula and inserts on the wing of the atlas. Its function is to advance the limb and flex the neck laterally. It is innervated by the accessory nerve.

Trapezius: originates on the supraspinous ligament and inserts on the spine of the scapula. Its function is to elevate and abduct the forelimb. It is innervated by the accessory nerve.

Rhomboideus: originates on the nuchal crest of the occipital bone and inserts on the scapula. Its function is to elevate the forelimb. It is innervated by the ventral branches of the spinal nerves.

Latissimus dorsi: originates on thoracolumbar fascia and inserts on the teres major tuberosity of the humerus. Its function is to flex the shoulder joint. It is innervated by the thoracodorsal nerve.

Serratus ventralis: originates on the transverse processes of the last 5 cervical vertebrae and inserts on the scapula. Its function is to support the trunk and depress the scapula. It is innervated by the ventral branches of the cervical spinal nerves.

Intrinsic muscles of the thoracic limb:

Deltoideus: originates on the acromial process of the scapula and inserts on the deltoid tuberosity. It acts to flex the shoulder. It is innervated by the axillary nerve.

Infraspinatus: originates on the infraspinatus fossa and inserts on the greater tubercle of the humerus. It acts to extend and flex the shoulder joint. It is innervated by the suprascapular nerve.

Teres minor: originates on the infra glenoid tubercle on the scapula and inserts on the teres minor tuberosity of the humerus. It acts to flex the shoulder and rotate the arm laterally. It is innervated by the axillary nerve.

Supraspinatus: originates on the supraspinous fossa and inserts on the greater tubercle of the humerus. It acts to extend and stabilize the shoulder joint. It is innervated by the suprascapular nerve.

Medial muscles of the scapula and shoulder:

Subscapularis: originates on the subscapular fossa and inserts on the greater tubercle of the humerus. It acts to rotate the arm medially and stabilize the joint. It is innervated by the subscapular nerve.

Teres major: originates on the scapula and inserts on the teres major tuberosity of the humerus. It acts to flex the shoulder and rotate the arm medially. It is innervated by the axillary nerve.

Coracobrachialis: originates on the coracoid process of the scapula and inserts on the crest of the lesser tubercle of the humerus. It acts to adduct, extend and stabilize the shoulder joint. It is innervated by the musculocutaneous nerve.

Caudal muscles of brachium:

Tensor fasciae antebrachium: originates on the fascia covering the latissimus dorsi and inserts on the olecranon. It acts to extend the elbow. It is innervated by the radial nerve.

Triceps brachii: originates on the caudal border of the scapula and inserts on the olecranon tuber. It acts to extend the elbow and flex the shoulder. It is innervated by the radial nerve.

Anconeus: originates on the humerus and inserts on the proximal end of the ulna. It acts to extend the elbow. It is innervated by the radial nerve.

Cranial muscles of the arm:

Biceps brachia: originates on the supraglenoid tubercle and inserts on the ulnar and radial tuberosities. It acts to flex the elbow and extend the shoulder. It is innervated by the musculocutaneous nerve.

Brachialis: originates on the lateral surface of humerus and inserts on the ulnar and radial tuberosities. It acts to flex the elbow. It is innervated by the musculocutaneous nerve.

Cranial and lateral muscles of antebrachium:

Extensor carpi radial: originates on the supracondylar crest and inserts on the metacarpals. It acts to extend the carpus. It is innervated by the radial nerve.

Common digital extensor: originates on the lateral epicondyle of the humerus and inserts on the distal phalanges. It acts to extend the carpus and joints of the digits 3, 4, and 5. It is innervated by the radial nerve.

Extensor carpi ulnar: originates on the lateral epicondyle of the humerus and inserts on the metacarpal 5 and the accessory carpal bone. It acts to abduct and extend the carpal joint. It is innervated by the radial nerve.

Supinator: originates on the lateral epicondyle of the humerus and inserts on the radius. It acts to rotate the forearm laterally. It is innervated by the radial nerve.

Abductor pollicis longus: originates on the ulna and inserts on metacarpal 1. It acts to abduct the digit and extend the carpal joints. It is innervated by the radial nerve.

Caudal and medial muscles of forearm:

Pronator teres: originates on the medial epicondyle of the humerus and inserts on the medial border of the radius. It acts to rotate forearm medially and flex the elbow. It is innervated by the median nerve.

Flexor carpi radial: originates on the medial epicondyle of the humerus and inserts on the palmar side of metacarpals 2 and 3. It acts to flex the carpus. It is innervated by the median nerve.

Superficial digital flexor: originates on the medial epicondyle of the humerus and inserts on the palmar surface of the middle phalanges. It acts to flex the carpus, metacarpophalangeal and proximal interphalangeal joints of the digits. It is innervated by the median nerve.

Flexor carpi ulnar: originates on the olecranon and inserts on the accessory carpal bone. It acts to flex the carpus. It is innervated by the ulnar nerve.

Deep digital flexor: originates on the medial epicondyle of the humerus and inserts on the palmar surface of the distal phalanx. It acts to flex the carpus, metacarpophalangeal joints, and the proximal and distal interphalangeal joints of the digits. It is innervated by the median nerve.

Pronator quadratus: originates on surfaces of the radius and ulna. It acts to pronate the paw. It is innervated by the median nerve.

Caudal muscles of the thigh:

Biceps femoris: originates on the ischiatic tuberosity and inserts on the patellar ligament. It acts to extend the hip, stifle and hock. It is innervated by the sciatic nerve.

Semitendinosus: originates on the ischiatic tuberosity and inserts on the tibia. It acts to extend the hip, flex the stifle and extend the hock. It is innervated by the sciatic nerve.

Semimembranosus: originates on the ischiatic tuberosity and inserts on the femur and tibia. It acts to extend the hip and stifle. It is innervated by the sciatic nerve.

Medial muscles of the thigh:

Sartorius: originates on the ilium and inserts on the patella and tibia. It acts to flex the hip and both flex and extend the stifle. It is innervated by the femoral nerve.

Gracilis: originates on the pelvic symphysis and inserts on the cranial border of the tibia. It acts to adduct the limb, flex the stifle and extend the hip and hock. It is innervated by the obturator nerve.

Pectineus: originates on the iliopubic eminence and inserts on the caudal femur. It acts to adduct the limb. It is innervated by the obturator nerve.

Adductor: originates on the pelvic symphysis and inserts on the lateral femur. It acts to adduct the limb and extend the hip. It is innervated by the obturator nerve.

Lateral muscles of the pelvis:

Tensor fasciae latae: originates on the tuber coxae of the ilium and inserts on the lateral femoral fascia. It acts to flex the hip and extend the stifle. It is innervated by the cranial gluteal nerve.

Superficial gluteal: originates on the lateral border of the sacrum and inserts on the 3rd trochanter. It acts to extend the hip and abduct the limb. It is innervated by the caudal gluteal nerve.

Middle gluteal: originates on the ilium and inserts on the greater trochanter. It acts to abduct the hip and rotate the pelvic limb medially. It is innervated by the cranial gluteal nerve.

Deep gluteal: originates on the ischiatic spine and inserts on the greater trochanter. It acts to extend the hip and rotate the pelvic limb medially. It is innervated by the cranial gluteal nerve.

Caudal hip muscles:

Internal obturator: originates on the pelvic symphysis and inserts on the trochanteric fossa of the femur. It acts to rotate the pelvic limb laterally. It is innervated by the sciatic nerve.

Gemelli: originates on the lateral surface of the ischium and inserts on the trochanteric fossa. It acts to rotate the pelvic limb laterally. It is innervated by the sciatic nerve.

Quadratus femoris: originates on the ischium and inserts on the intertrochanteric crest. It acts to extend the hip and rotate the pelvic limb laterally.

External obturator: originates on the pubis and ischium and inserts on the trochanteric fossa. It acts to rotate the pelvic limb laterally. It is innervated by the obturator nerve.

Cranial muscles of the thigh:

Quadriceps femoris: originates on the femur and the ilium and inserts on the tibial tuberosity. It acts to extend the stifle and to flex the hip. It is innervated by the femoral nerve.

Ilipsoas: originates on the ilium and inserts on the lesser trochanter. It acts to flex the hip. It is innervated by the femoral nerve.

Craniolateral muscles of the leg:

Cranial tibial: originates on tibia and inserts on the plantar surfaces of metatarsals 1 and 2. It acts to flex the tarsus and rotates the paw laterally. It is innervated by the peroneal nerve.

Long digital extensor: originates from the extensor fossa of the femur and inserts on the extensor processes of the distal phalanges. It acts to extend the digits and flex the tarsus. It is innervated by the peroneal nerve.

Peroneus longus: originates on both the tibia and fibula and inserts on the 4th tarsal bone and the plantar aspect of the metatarsals. It acts to flex the tarsus and rotate the paw medially. It is innervated by the peroneal nerve.

Caudal muscles of the leg:

Gastrocnemius: originates on the supracondylar tuberosities of the femur and inserts on the tuber calcanei. It acts to extend the tarsus and flex the stifle. It is innervated by the tibial nerve.

Superficial digital flexor: originates on the lateral supracondylar tuberosity of the femur and inserts on the tuber calcanei and bases of the middle phalanges. It acts to flex the stifle and extend the tarsus. It is innervated by the tibial nerve.

Deep digital flexor: originates on the fibular and inserts on the plantar surface of the distal phalanges. It acts to flex the digits and extend the tarsus. It is innervated by the tibial nerve.

Popliteus: originates on the lateral condyle of the femur and inserts on the tibia. It acts to rotate the leg medially. It is innervated by the tibial nerve.

Skeleton

Bones and their significant points for muscle attachment:

Scapula:
Spine of the Scapula, Supraglenoid Tubercle, Glenoid Cavity, Acromion Process, Supraspinous Fossa, Infraspinous Fossa, Neck, Coracoid, Process, Subscapular Fossa

Humerus:
Head of Humerus,
Greater Tubercle,
Lesser Tubercle,
Intertubercular Groove,
Deltopectoral Crest,
Deltoid Tuberosity,
Body of the Humerus,
Epicondyles (Medial and Lateral),
Humeral condyle (Trochlea and Capitulum, Radial and Olecranon Fossae)

Ulna and Radius:	
Olecranon Process,
Trochlear Notch,
Anconeal Process,
Coronoid Processes (Medial and Lateral),
Body of Ulna,
Head of Radius,
Body of Radius,
Distal Trochlea,
Styiloid Process (Medial and Lateral),
Interosseus Space

Metacarpals:	
Carpal Bones (Radial and Ulnar), 
Accessory Carpal Bone,
First, Second, Third, and Fourth Metacarpals,
Phalanges,
Proximal Base,
Body,
Head,
Ungual crest,
Ungual process (Nails),
Extensor process,
Carpometacarpal Joints,
Metacarpophalangeal Joints,
Proximalinterphalangeal Joints,
Interphalangeal Joints

Femur:	
Head,
Ligament of Head,
Neck,
Greater Trochanter,
Lesser Trochanter,
Trochanteric Fossa,
Acetabulum Fossa (on Hip Bone),
Distal Femur,
Trochlea (and Ridges),
Condyles (Medial/Lateral),
Epicondyles (Medial/Lateral),
Intercondylar Fossa,
Extensor Fossa (Tiny Dent),
Infrapatellar Fat Pad,
Fabellae (Medial/Lateral)

Patella
kneecap

Tibia and Fibula:	
Tibial Condyles (Medial/Lateral),
Intercondylar Eminences,
Extensor Notch (Lateral),
Tibial Tuberosity (Cranial),
Tibial Cochlea,
Medial Malleolus,
Lateral Malleolus,
Head of Fibula

Metatarsals:	
Talus,
Calcaneus,
Trochlear Ridges,
Central Tarsal Bone,
First, Second, and Third Tarsal Bones

Vertebra	
Body,
Pedicles,
Laminae,
Spinous Process,
Transverse Process (Wings),
Articular Process,
Vertebral Foramen,
Intervertebral Foramina,
Atlas (C1),
Axis (C2), dens,
Ventral Lamina (on C6)

Pelvis:
Acetabulum,
Ilium, Ischium,
Pubis

Skull
In 1986, a study of skull morphology found that the domestic dog is morphologically distinct from all other canids except the wolf-like canids. The difference in size and proportion between some breeds are as great as those between any wild genera, but all dogs are clearly members of the same species. In 2010, a study of dog skull shape compared to extant carnivorans proposed that "The greatest shape distances between dog breeds clearly surpass the maximum divergence between species in the Carnivora. Moreover, domestic dogs occupy a range of novel shapes outside the domain of wild carnivorans."

The domestic dog compared to the wolf shows the greatest variation in the size and shape of the skull (Evans 1979) that range from 7 to 28 cm in length (McGreevy 2004). Wolves are dolichocephalic (long skulled) but not as extreme as some breeds of dogs such as greyhounds and Russian wolfhounds (McGreevy 2004). Canine brachycephaly (short-skulledness) is found only in domestic dogs and is related to paedomorphosis (Goodwin 1997). Puppies are born with short snouts, with the longer skull of dolichocephalic dogs emerging in later development (Coppinger 1995). Other differences in head shape between brachycephalic and dolichocephalic dogs include changes in the craniofacial angle (angle between the basilar axis and hard palate) (Regodón 1993), morphology of the temporomandibular joint (Dickie 2001), and radiographic anatomy of the cribriform plate (Schwarz 2000).

One study found that the relative reduction in dog skull length compared to its width (the Cephalic Index) was significantly correlated to both the position and the angle of the brain within the skull. This was regardless of the brain size or the body weight of the dog.

Respiratory system 

The respiratory system is the set of organs responsible for the intake of oxygen and the expelling of carbon dioxide.

As dogs have few sweat glands in their skin, the respiratory system also plays an important role in body thermoregulation.

Dogs are mammals with two large lungs that are further divided into lobes. They have a spongy appearance due to the presence of a system of delicate branches of the bronchioles in each lung, ending in closed, thin-walled chambers (the points of gas exchange) called alveoli.

The presence of a muscular structure, the diaphragm, exclusive to mammals, divides the peritoneal cavity from the pleural cavity, besides assisting the lungs during inhalation.

Digestive system
The organs that make up the canine digestive system are:

 Mouth
 Tongue
 Esophagus
 Stomach
 Liver
 Pancreas
 Large intestine
 Small intestine
 Rectum
 Anus



Physical characteristics

Sixty percent of the dog's body mass falls on the front legs.

Like most predatory mammals, the dog has powerful muscles, a cardiovascular system that supports both sprinting and endurance and teeth for catching, holding, and tearing.

The dog's muscles provides the ability to jump and leap. Their legs can propel them forward rapidly, leaping as necessary to chase and overcome prey. They have small, tight feet, walking on their toes (thus having a digitigrade stance and locomotion). Their rear legs are fairly rigid and sturdy. The front legs are loose and flexible with only muscle attaching them to the torso.

The dog's muzzle size will vary with the breed. Dogs with medium muzzles, such as the German Shepherd Dog, are called mesocephalic and dogs with a pushed in muzzle, such as the Pug, are called brachycephalic. Today's toy breeds have skeletons that mature in only a few months, while giant breeds, such as the Mastiffs, take 16 to 18  months for the skeleton to mature. Dwarfism has affected the proportions of some breeds' skeletons, as in the Basset Hound.

All dogs (and all living Canidae) have a ligament connecting the spinous process of their first thoracic (or chest) vertebra to the back of the axis bone (second cervical or neck bone), which supports the weight of the head without active muscle exertion, thus saving energy. This ligament is analogous in function (but different in exact structural detail) to the nuchal ligament found in ungulates. This ligament allows dogs to carry their heads while running long distances, such as while following scent trails with their nose to the ground, without expending much energy.

Dogs have disconnected shoulder bones (lacking the collar bone of the human skeleton) that allow a greater stride length for running and leaping. They walk on four toes, front and back, and have vestigial dewclaws on their front legs and on their rear legs. When a dog has extra dewclaws in addition to the usual one in the rear, the dog is said to be "double dewclawed."

Size
Dogs are highly variable in height and weight. The smallest known adult dog was a Yorkshire Terrier that stood only  at the shoulder,  in length along the head and body, and weighed only . The tallest known adult dog is a Great Dane that stands  at the shoulder.

In 2007, a study identified a gene that is proposed as being responsible for size. The study found a regulatory sequence next to the gene Insulin-like growth factor 1 (IGF1) and together with the gene and regulatory sequence "is a major contributor to body size in all small dogs." Two variants of this gene were found in large dogs, making a more complex reason for large breed size. The researchers concluded this gene's instructions to make dogs small must be at least 12,000  years old and it is not found in wolves.  Another study has proposed that lap dogs (small dogs) are among the oldest existing dog types.

Coat

Domestic dogs often display the remnants of countershading, a common natural camouflage pattern. The general theory of countershading is that an animal that is lit from above will appear lighter on its upper half and darker on its lower half where it will usually be in its own shade. This is a pattern that predators can learn to watch for. A counter shaded animal will have dark coloring on its upper surfaces and light coloring below. This reduces the general visibility of the animal. One reminder of this pattern is that many breeds will have the occasional "blaze", stripe, or "star" of white fur on their chest or undersides.

A study found that the genetic basis that explains coat colors in horse coats and cat coats did not apply to dog coats.  The project took samples from 38 different breeds to find the gene (a beta defensin gene) responsible for dog coat color. One version produces yellow dogs and a mutation produces black. All dog coat colors are modifications of black or yellow. For example, the white in white miniature schnauzers is a cream color, not albinism (a genotype of e/e at MC1R.)

Modern dog breeds exhibit a diverse array of fur coats, including dogs without fur, such as the Mexican Hairless Dog. Dog coats vary in texture, color, and markings, and a specialized vocabulary has evolved to describe each characteristic.

Tail
There are many different shapes of dog tails: straight, straight up, sickle, curled and cork-screw. In some breeds, the tail is traditionally docked to avoid injuries (especially for hunting dogs). It can happen that some puppies are born with a short tail or no tail in some breeds. Dogs have a violet gland or supracaudal gland on the dorsal (upper) surface of their tails.

Footpad
Dogs can stand, walk and run on snow and ice for long periods of time. When a dog's footpad is exposed to the cold, heat loss is prevented by an adaptation of the blood system that recirculates heat back into the body. It brings blood from the skin surface and retains warm blood in the pad surface.

Senses

Vision
Like most mammals, dogs have only two types of cone photoreceptor, making them dichromats. These cone cells are maximally sensitive between 429 nm and 555 nm.  Behavioural studies have shown that the dog's visual world consists of yellows, blues and grays, but they have difficulty differentiating red and green making their color vision equivalent to red–green color blindness in humans (deuteranopia). When a human perceives an object as "red," this object appears as "yellow" to the dog and the human perception of "green" appears as "white," a shade of gray. This white region (the neutral point) occurs around 480 nm, the part of the spectrum which appears blue-green to humans. For dogs, wavelengths longer than the neutral point cannot be distinguished from each other and all appear as yellow.

Dogs use color instead of brightness to differentiate light or dark blue/yellow. They are less sensitive to differences in grey shades than humans and also can detect brightness at about half the accuracy of humans.

The dog's visual system has evolved to aid proficient hunting. While a dog's visual acuity is poor (that of a poodle's has been estimated to translate to a Snellen rating of 20/75), their visual discrimination for moving objects is very high.

Dogs can detect a change in movement that exists in a single diopter of space within their eye. Humans, by comparison, require a change of between 10 and 20 diopters to detect movement.

As crepuscular hunters, dogs often rely on their vision in low light situations: They have very large pupils, a high density of rods in the fovea, an increased flicker rate, and a tapetum lucidum. The tapetum is a reflective surface behind the retina that reflects light to give the photoreceptors a second chance to catch the photons. There is also a relationship between body size and overall diameter of the eye. A range of 9.5 and 11.6  mm can be found between various breeds of dogs. This 20% variance can be substantial and is associated as an adaptation toward superior night vision.

The eyes of different breeds of dogs have different shapes, dimensions, and retina configurations. Many long-nosed breeds have a "visual streak"—a wide foveal region that runs across the width of the retina and gives them a very wide field of excellent vision. Some long-muzzled breeds, in particular, the sighthounds, have a field of vision up to 270° (compared to 180° for humans). Short-nosed breeds, on the other hand, have an "area centralis": a central patch with up to three times the density of nerve endings as the visual streak, giving them detailed sight much more like a human's. Some broad-headed breeds with short noses have a field of vision similar to that of humans.
]
Most breeds have good vision, but some show a genetic predisposition for myopia – such as Rottweilers, with which one out of every two has been found to be myopic. Dogs also have a greater divergence of the eye axis than humans, enabling them to rotate their pupils farther in any direction. The divergence of the eye axis of dogs ranges from 12–25° depending on the breed.

Experimentation has proven that dogs can distinguish between complex visual images such as that of a cube or a prism. Dogs also show attraction to static visual images such as the silhouette of a dog on a screen, their own reflections, or videos of dogs; however, their interest declines sharply once they are unable to make social contact with the image.

Hearing

The frequency range of dog hearing is between 16-40 Hz (compared to 20–70 Hz for humans) and up to 45–60 kHz (compared to 13–20 kHz for humans), which means that dogs can detect sounds far beyond the upper limit of the human auditory spectrum.

Dogs have ear mobility that allows them to rapidly pinpoint the exact location of a sound. Eighteen or more muscles can tilt, rotate, raise, or lower a dog's ear. A dog can identify a sound's location much faster than a human can, as well as hear sounds at four times the distance.

Smell

While the human brain is dominated by a large visual cortex, the dog brain is dominated by a large olfactory cortex. Dogs have roughly forty times more smell-sensitive receptors than humans, ranging from about 125 million to nearly 300 million in some dog breeds, such as bloodhounds.

Taste
Dogs have around 1,700 taste buds compared to humans with around 9,000. The sweet taste buds in dogs respond to a chemical called furaneol which is found in many fruits and in tomatoes. It appears that dogs do like this flavor and it probably evolved because in a natural environment dogs frequently supplement their diet of small animals with whatever fruits happen to be available. Because of dogs' dislike of bitter tastes, various sprays, and gels have been designed to keep dogs from chewing on furniture or other objects. Dogs also have taste buds that are tuned for water, which is something they share with other carnivores but is not found in humans. This taste sense is found at the tip of the dog's tongue, which is the part of the tongue that they curl to lap water. This area responds to water at all times, but when the dog has eaten salty or sugary foods the sensitivity to the taste of water increases. It is proposed that this ability to taste water evolved as a way for the body to keep internal fluids in balance after the animal has eaten things that will either result in more urine being passed or will require more water to adequately process. It certainly appears that when these special water taste buds are active, dogs seem to get an extra pleasure out of drinking water, and will drink copious amounts of it.

Touch

The main difference between human and dog touch is the presence of specialized whiskers known as vibrissae. Vibrissae are present above the dog's eyes, below their jaw, and on their muzzle. They are sophisticated sensing organs. Vibrissae are more rigid and embedded much more deeply in the skin than other hairs and have a greater number of receptor cells at their base. They can detect air currents, subtle vibrations, and objects in the dark. They provide an early warning system for objects that might strike the face or eyes, and probably help direct food and objects towards the mouth.

Magnetic sensitivity

Dogs may prefer, when they are off the leash and Earth's magnetic field is calm, to urinate and defecate with their bodies aligned on a north–south axis. Another study suggested that dogs can see the earth's magnetic field.

Temperature regulation

Primarily, dogs regulate their body temperature through panting and sweating via their paws. Panting moves cooling air over the moist surfaces of the tongue and lungs, transferring heat to the atmosphere.

Dogs and other canids also possess a very well-developed set of nasal turbinates, an elaborate set of bones and associated soft-tissue structures (including arteries and veins) in the nasal cavities. These turbinates allow for heat exchange between small arteries and veins on their maxilloturbinate surfaces (the surfaces of turbinates positioned on maxilla bone) in a counter-current heat-exchange system. Dogs are capable of prolonged chases, in contrast to the ambush predation of cats, and these complex turbinates play an important role in enabling this (cats only possess a much smaller and less-developed set of nasal turbinates). This same complex turbinate structure helps conserve water in arid environments. The water conservation and thermoregulatory capabilities of these well-developed turbinates in dogs may have been crucial adaptations that allowed dogs (including both domestic dogs and their wild prehistoric ancestors) to survive in the harsh Arctic environment and other cold areas of northern Eurasia and North America, which are both very dry and very cold.

References

Further reading 
 
  .

External links 

 
Dog shows and showing